Constant Lestienne (born 23 May 1992) is a French professional tennis player. He competes mainly on the ITF Men's Circuit and ATP Challenger Tour. He reached his highest ATP singles ranking of World No. 48 on 6 February 2023 and his highest doubles ranking of World No. 271 was achieved on 20 March 2023. He has won five ATP Challenger Tour singles titles. In addition, he has won five singles titles and three doubles titles in the ITF Men's Circuit.

Career

2015: ATP Tour debut
Lestienne reached his first career ATP Tour singles main draw at the 2015 Estoril Open after winning two singles qualifying matches. He lost in the first round to Pablo Carreño Busta.

2016: First challenger title, betting scandal and ban
In May 2016, Lestienne won his maiden ATP Challenger Tour tournament in Ostrava.

In September 2016 Lestienne was suspended for seven months and fined $10,000 by the International Tennis Federation for betting on tennis matches. The Tennis Integrity Unit (TIU) in cooperation with French online gambling regulator ARJEL found that Lestienne had bet on 220 tennis matches between February 2012 and June 2015. None of these matches were his own. Half of the ban was suspended and his fine would be halved if he assisted the TIU.

2017: Grand Slam debut
He made his Major main draw debut at the 2017 French Open after receiving a wildcard to the doubles main draw with Corentin Moutet. They defeated Dustin Brown and Lu Yen-hsun in the first round, but were defeated by Jean-Julien Rojer and Horia Tecău in the second round.

2021-2022: Four Challengers, Top 75, First ATP semifinal
He won his third Challenger at the 2021 JC Ferrero Challenger Open in Alicante, Spain in October 2021. As a result he climbed 50 positions back up in the rankings to world No. 208 on 18 October 2021.

On August 1, 2022 Lestienne entered the Top 100 at World No. 90, following two ATP Challenger Tour titles in Spain in July 2022 and two more finals in the same year. He won his third Challenger in Vancouver in August and reached the top 75 in the rankings on 22 August 2022.

In September 2022, Lestienne reached his first quarterfinal on the ATP Tour at the San Diego Open defeating Brandon Holt and sixth seed Alejandro Tabilo. He entered the top 70 in the rankings on 26 September 2022 at world No. 68. Lestienne followed this by reaching his first semifinal at the 2022 Tel Aviv Open defeating seventh seed compatriot Adrian Mannarino, Emil Ruusuvuori
and fourth seed Maxime Cressy in the quarterfinal, his first win against a player in the Top 50.

2023: Major & Masters debuts, first Major win & top 50 
At 30 years old, he made his Grand Slam debut at the 2023 Australian Open and won his first match defeating Thiago Monteiro.
He reached the top 50 on 6 February 2023 at world No. 48.

He made his Masters debut at the 2023 BNP Paribas Open but retired in the first round against Emil Ruusuvuori.

ATP career finals

Doubles: 1 (1 runner up)

ATP Challenger Tour and ITF Men's Circuit finals

Singles: 25 (11-14)

Doubles (3–3)

References

External links
 
 

French male tennis players
1992 births
Living people
Tennis controversies
Sportspeople from Amiens